The Swinomish   are a historically Lushootseed-speaking Native American people in western Washington state in the United States. The Tribe lives in the southeastern part of Fidalgo Island in northern Puget Sound, near the San Juan Islands, in Skagit County, Washington.

Swinomish people are enrolled in the federally recognized Swinomish Indian Tribal Community, also known as the Swinomish Tribe, which is headquartered in Swinomish Village, across the Swinomish Channel from La Conner.

Language
The Swinomish people speak a subdialect of the Northern dialect of the Lushootseed language.

Culture

The lifestyle of the Swinomish, like many Northwest Coast indigenous peoples, involves the fishing of salmon and collecting of shellfish. They reserved the right to fish and harvest in their usual and accustomed areas in the Point Elliott Treaty of 1855.

History
The Swinomish moved onto reservation lands after the signing of the Point Elliott Treaty in 1855.
The Swinomish police department was the second in the U.S.--and the first in Washington State—to be state-accredited.

Native American Advocacy

The current Swinomish Chairman, Brian Cladoosby, is the 21st president of the National Congress of American Indians (NCAI).

Notes

External links

March Point (2008), a film about the Swinomish Reservation
March Point page, from Independent Lens site
"Swinomish Indian Tribe", a brief history at u-s-history.com

Native American tribes in Washington (state)
Geography of Skagit County, Washington
Coast Salish